Miguel Sierra Zúñiga is a Mexican politician affiliated with the National Action Party. As of 2014 he served as Deputy of the LIX Legislature of the Mexican Congress representing Querétaro as replacement of Ricardo Alegre.

References

Date of birth unknown
Living people
Politicians from Querétaro
National Action Party (Mexico) politicians
Year of birth missing (living people)
Deputies of the LIX Legislature of Mexico
Members of the Chamber of Deputies (Mexico) for Querétaro